Yenidere can refer to:

 Yenidere Dam
 Yenidere, Kale
 Yenidere, Taşova